Rice v. Rehner, 463 U.S. 713 (1983), was a United States Supreme Court case in which the Court held California may properly require respondent to obtain a state license in order to sell liquor for off-premises consumption.

Background 
Eva Rehner was a federally licensed Indian trader who operates a general store on the Pala Indian Reservation, a Native American (Indian) reservation in California. California refused an exemption from the state liquor licensing scheme and she filed suit in U.S. District Court. The District Court dismissed the suit, holding that Rehner was required to have a state license under 18 U.S.C. § 1161. The Court of Appeals reversed, holding that § 1161 preempted state law over tribal liquor sales in Indian country.

Opinion of the Court 
Justice Justice O'Connor delivered the opinion of the Court. O'Connor noted that there was no history of liquor regulation by Indian tribes. The statute in question, 18 U.S.C. § 1161 authorized the state regulation of liquor with Indian tribes. Both the states and the tribes are authorized to regulate liquor under the statute. Here the application of the state liquor laws is specifically authorized by Congress and does not interfere with federal policies concerning the reservation.

The decision of the Ninth Circuit was reversed and remanded for action in compliance with the Court's opinion.

Dissent 
Justice Blackmun dissented. Blackmun noted that 25 U.S.C. § 261 provided that “The Commissioner of Indian Affairs shall have the sole power and authority to appoint traders to the Indian tribes and to make such rules and regulations as he may deem just and proper specifying the kind and quantity of goods and the prices at which such goods shall be sold to the Indians.” Blackmun believed that this prevented state regulation of Indian traders.

See also 
List of United States Supreme Court cases, volume 463

References

External links
 

1983 in United States case law
United States Supreme Court cases
United States Supreme Court cases of the Burger Court
United States Native American case law
History of San Diego County, California
Alcohol law in the United States
Luiseño
Cupeno
Native American history of California